The House of Vigil  is a noble family that first began in the Kingdom of Asturias around the 5th to 8th century. The family originated from the Asturian countryside as watchmen, gradually rising in prominence until they were one of the first families to achieve titles of nobility.

The Vigils produced two dukes of the Spanish Empire—Antonio Francisco Pimentel de Zúñiga y Vigil de Quiñones (10th Duke of Benavente), Francisco Alonso Pimentel Vigil de Quiñones Borja Aragón y Centelles (11th Duke of Benavente), and one president of the Federal Republic of Central America—Diego Vigil Cocaña.

Sources

External links
 the Spanish Archives of New Mexico from archive.org
 A HISTORY OF CORRALES from the Village of Corrales Historic Preservation Committee